William Ewin (October 8, 1808 – November 25, 1886) was an American artisan, lawyer, civil servant and State Senator.

Early life 
Ewin was born in County Leitrim, Ireland on October 8, 1808. He then emigrated with his parents to New York City in 1822. From 1830 to 1840 he worked in Philadelphia and Baltimore as a maker of mathematical instruments.

Tucker County
He married Martha Ann Dennis in 1835. In 1840 he moved to Western Ford, Randolph County, Virginia, which today is Saint George, Tucker County, West Virginia. Ewin studied law and lobbied the Virginia General Assembly for the formation of Tucker county, accomplished in 1856.

Work
Ewin served as Postmaster and County Circuit Clerk until barred from public service in 1861 because he, as did other county officials, supported Virginia's secession from the United States.

Ewin used his surveying and legal skills to obtain and sell land grants of many thousand acres. After the Presidential and State amnesties of 1868 and 1871 for secessionists, he was elected Prosecuting Attorney, then to the West Virginia Senate from 1879 to 1882.

Death and Burial
Ewin died November 25, 1886, and is buried in the family graveyard overlooking the Cheat River at Saint George.

References

External Links
The West Virginia & Regional History Center at West Virginia University houses the papers of William Ewin within two collections, A&M 33 and A&M 106

1808 births
1886 deaths
19th-century American lawyers
County prosecuting attorneys in West Virginia
Irish emigrants to the United States (before 1923)
People from Tucker County, West Virginia
Politicians from County Leitrim
People from County Leitrim
Virginia postmasters
Virginia lawyers
West Virginia lawyers
West Virginia state senators
19th-century American politicians
County clerks in Virginia